Haun is both a surname and a given name. Notable people with the name include:

Surname
 Christopher Haun (1821–1861), American potter
 Eberhard Haun (1949–1976), German footballer
 Henry P. Haun (1815–1860), American politician
 Jeremy Haun, American comics artist
 Jimmy Haun, American rock guitarist
 Lindsey Haun (born 1984), American actress and singer
 Thassilo Haun (born 1973), German former tennis player

Given name
 Haun Saussy (born 1960), American professor

See also
 Haun Creek, a stream in Kansas, United States